Thalagavara Narayanarao Seetharam (born 6 December 1948) is a prominent Kannada film and TV serial director, actor and screenwriter. He has become a cultural icon in Karnataka, India, through his work in several art mediums.  Seetharam has written, directed, and produced plays, movies, and top-rated television series which have attracted millions of viewers.

Early life
Seetharam was born on 6 December 1948 in Thalagavara village near the Doddaballapura town in the erstwhile Mysore State. He was the third child to his parents Narayanrao and Sundaramma. He completed his high school education in Doddaballapur Municipal School, Doddaballapura, and pre-university course in National College, Bangalore. He then obtained his degree in Bachelor of Science before obtaining his bachelor's degree in Law. This was when he decided to take keen interest in plays, having worked with playwright P. Lankesh during the time. Seetharam decided to stay in Bangalore after completing his education, by participating in plays. He rejected his father's request to return to his village and involve himself in agriculture and to practice as a lawyer. Having been influenced by Lankesh and U. R. Ananthamurthy, he believed owning a piece of land is a sin. Saddened by his decision, his father, a patient, stopped consuming medicine and died shortly thereafter leaving Seetharam with guilt. In 2014, during his appearance in the talk show Weekend with Ramesh, Seetharam said that many of his plays were made as tributes to his father and his television serials were made as tributes to women, inspired mainly by his deceased sister, Padma.

Career

Seetharam began his career as an associate to playwright and film director, P. Lankesh. He played a pivotal role in the Lankesh directed National Award winning film Pallavi (1976). He was also associated with the famous director Puttanna Kanagal and had written scripts for his movies. He also made appearances as an actor in some movies. He was noticed when he started directing TV serials for Doordarshan. Fame and recognition came when he directed Mayamruga, a daily Kannada serial which stood apart for its take on reality. Mayamruga has seen a DVD avatar, probably a first for a Kannada serial. He then went on to direct Kamanabillu which was the first serial on a satellite TV to be watched widely His association with ETV Kannada resulted in famous serials like Manvantara and Muktha. He has acted in most of his serials and he likes to play the character of a lawyer who comes to the rescue of the oppressed.

He developed a concept of Samvada, wherein he held organised meetings with his audience throughout Karnataka. These became so popular that ETV Kannada telecasted these interactions as well.

He was the president of Karnataka State Film Awards jury for the year 2006.

Filmography

Films

Television
As Director and writer

Dramas
Nammolagobba Naajukayya
Baduka Mannisu Prabhuve
Asphota

Awards
 1989–90 - Karnataka State Film Award for Best Dialogue Writer – Panchama Veda (1990)
 2000 - National Film Award for Best Feature Film in Kannada – Mathadana
 2005 - Karnataka State Government's 'Aryabhata Awards': 'Best Director' award for the direction of the teleserial Mukta.

References

External links

 Exclusive website for T.N.Seetharam's Muktha Muktha serial available on Chitraranga.com
 Sampada Podcast with T N Seetharam
 Usha Kattemane on TN Seetharam

Living people
1948 births
Kannada film directors
Indian television directors
Male actors in Kannada cinema
Male actors from Bangalore
People from Bangalore Rural district
20th-century Indian male actors
20th-century Indian dramatists and playwrights
20th-century Indian film directors
Film directors from Bangalore
Screenwriters from Bangalore
Recipients of the Rajyotsava Award 2005